Arthur Nersesian is an American novelist, playwright, and poet. 

Nersesian is of Armenian and Irish descent. He was born and raised in New York City, and graduated from Midwood High School in Brooklyn, New York. 

His novels include The Fuck-up, Manhattan Loverboy, Dogrun, Chinese Takeout, Suicide Casanova and Unlubricated. He has also published a collection of plays, East Village Tetralogy. He has written three books of poems and one book of plays. In 2005, Nersesian received the Anahid Literary Prize for Armenian Literature for his novel Unlubricated. Nersesian is the managing editor of the literary magazine, The Portable Lower East Side, and was an English teacher at Hostos Community College, City University of New York, in the South Bronx. His novel Dogrun was adapted into the 2016 feature film My Dead Boyfriend. His novel The Five Books of (Robert) Moses is 1,506 pages long, took him more than 25 years to write, and was published on July 28, 2020.

Bibliography

Novels
The Fuck-Up (1997) {New York]: MTV / Pocket Books
Manhattan Loverboy (2000) New York: Akashic Books
Dogrun (2000) New York: Pocket Books
Suicide Casanova (2002) New York: Akashic Books
Chinese Takeout (2003) New York: Perennial
Unlubricated (2004) New York: Perennial
The Swing Voter of Staten Island (2007) New York: Akashic Books
The Sacrificial Circumcision of the Bronx (2008)
Mesopotamia (2010) New York: Akashic Books
Gladyss of the Hunt (2014) Portland: Dark Passage
The Five Books of (Robert) Moses (2020) New York: Akashic Books

Plays
East Village Tetralogy (1995) New York: Bookstreet
 Poetry
New York Complaints [chapbook] (1993, Portable Press)
Tompkins Square & Other Ill-Fated Riots [chapbook] (1990, Portable Press)
Tremors and Faultlines: Photopoems of San Francisco (1995, Portable Press)

Foreign editions
Staten Island is the Spanish version of The Swing Voter of Staten Island, published by Alpha Decay in 2010.

Interviews

External links
Arthur Nersesian's home page
Hear Nersesian read from The Fuck-Up on Salon.com
interview at FreeWilliamsburg.com
Book review at bookslut.com
Tenement Painting by Nersesian at Smyles & Fish
Arthur Nersesian - New York's Best Kept Secret - Broowaha

References

20th-century American novelists
21st-century American novelists
American male novelists
American writers of Armenian descent
American people of Irish descent
City University of New York faculty
Writers from New York City
1958 births
Living people
20th-century American poets
20th-century American dramatists and playwrights
21st-century American poets
American male poets
American male dramatists and playwrights
20th-century American male writers
21st-century American male writers
Novelists from New York (state)
Hostos Community College faculty